Dominique Pierre Perrin (b. 1946) is a French mathematician and theoretical computer scientist known for his contributions to coding theory and to combinatorics on words. He is a professor of the University of Marne-la-Vallée and currently serves as the President of ESIEE Paris.

Biography

Perrin earned his PhD from Paris 7 University in 1975. In his early career, he was a CNRS researcher (1970–1977) and taught at the University of Chile (1972–1973). Later, he worked as a professor at the University of Rouen (1977–1983), Paris 7 University (1983–1993), and École Polytechnique (1982–2002). Since 1993, Perrin is a professor at the University of Marne-la-Vallée, and since 2004, he is the President of ESIEE Paris.

Perrin is a member of Academia Europaea since 1989.

Scientific contributions

Perrin has been a member of the Lothaire group of mathematicians that developed the foundations of combinatorics on words. He has co-authored three scientific monographs: "Theory of Codes" (1985), "Codes and Automata" (2009), and "Infinite Words" (2004), as well as the three Lothaire books.
Perrin has published around 50 research articles in formal language theory.

References

External links
 
 

French mathematicians
French computer scientists
Members of Academia Europaea
1946 births
Living people